Cataclysta albipunctalis is a Crambidae moth species in the genus Cataclysta. It was described by George Hampson in 1897 and is known from Madagascar.

References

Moths described in 1897
Acentropinae
Moths of Madagascar
Moths of Africa